Ostroh Raion was a raion in Rivne Oblast in western Ukraine. Its administrative center was the city of Ostroh which was administratively incorporated as a city of oblast significance and did not belong to the raion. The raion was abolished and its territory was merged into Rivne Raion on 18 July 2020 as part of the administrative reform of Ukraine, which reduced the number of raions of Rivne Oblast to four. The last estimate of the raion population was

See also
 Subdivisions of Ukraine

References

External links
 rv.gov.ua 

Former raions of Rivne Oblast
1940 establishments in Ukraine
Ukrainian raions abolished during the 2020 administrative reform